Winfred Nettleton "Munn" Ware was an American jazz trombonist. 

After having learned to play piano and banjo as a child, he took up the cornet while at Bowdoin College in Brunswick, Maine, first playing it professionally in Massachusetts before taking up the trombone around 1940. From 1942 to 1946 he played that instrument in an army band.

In 1946, Ware was in New York playing in bands led by Tony Parenti, Wild Bill Davison, and Danny Alvin.

From June 1947 he worked regularly at the Jazz Ltd. club in Chicago as a member of the house band led by club's co-owner, Bill Reinhardt. At around this time, Ware recorded with Sidney Bechet, Muggsy Spanier, and Doc Evans.

References

1909 births
1970 deaths
American jazz trombonists
20th-century American male musicians
American male jazz musicians